The Arab Air Carriers Organization (AACO) is a non-profit organization with 33 constituent airline members from 19 countries within North Africa and the Middle East: Algeria, Bahrain, Egypt, Iraq, Jordan, Kuwait, Lebanon, Libya, Mauritania, Morocco, Oman, Palestine, Qatar, Saudi Arabia, Sudan, Syria, Tunisia, the United Arab Emirates and Yemen. It is headquartered in Beirut, Lebanon. The AACO members collectively offer 3,514 daily flights to 451 airports in 127 countries.

History
The organization was created on 25 August 1965 upon the recommendation of the Transport Committee of the League of Arab States and the endorsement of the Arab transport ministers. Saudi Arabian Airlines was one of its founding members.

The AACO signed an agreement with the International Civil Aviation Organization that its airlines will have 0% growth of their emissions by 2020.

Organization

AACO is the platform of cooperation between its members and various stake-holders in the aviation industry, established partnership programs: one is the Partner Airlines, where non-Arab Airlines can join AACO and benefit from its joint work, the second is the Industry Partners, where aviation stakeholders attend AACO events and activities to strengthen their relations with member and partner airlines. It provides a joint framework for cooperation amongst its members in many areas as: Amadeus Distribution Agreement, Fuel, Maintenance Repair and Overhaul (MRO), Emergency Response Planning (ERP), Cooperation at Outstations, Environment, Aero-political Affairs, Future Distribution Strategies, Aviation Security (AVSEC), and training through AACO's regional training center.

Member airlines – Membership in AACO is available to Arab airlines operating both scheduled and non-scheduled services, internationally or domestically, mixed or cargo, in the following categories:
Active Member: Airlines operating scheduled international services
Associate Member: Airlines operating charter or non-scheduled operations and airlines operating pure domestic flights.
Partner airlines – AACO Partner Airlines, established in 2010, enables non – Arab airlines to join AACO as partners and benefit from the platform of cooperation between its members through AACO joint work to achieve tangible economic benefits.
Industry partners – AACO Industry Partnership, established in 1996, provides the platform through which manufacturers, service and system providers and others can communicate with AACO members, offer their products & services through joint forums, and network with member airlines through various AACO forums.

Members

Founding member
Ceased operations

Partners
 Malaysia Airlines (Oneworld)
 International Airlines Group
 Turkish Airlines (Star Alliance)
 Pegasus Airlines

Locations
AACO Headquarter: 85 Anis Nsouli St., Verdun, P.O.Box 13-5468, 2044-1408, Beirut, Lebanon
 RTC Amman:  12 Abdallah Ben Omar Street, Shmeisani, Amman – Jordan
RTC Cairo: Cairo International Airport, EgyptAir Training Center, S-Building, Third Floor, Cairo, Egypt

Operations

Regional Training Center (RTC)
AACO Regional Training Center (RTC) was established in 1996 in Amman – Jordan through a financial support from the European Commission and the two major aircraft manufacturers Airbus and Boeing, with a main objective of providing training for AACO members to be conducted in the region. AACO RTC provides industry courses in many aviation management and specialized fields and also provides customized courses in aviation, travel and tourism-related affairs. Its objective is to provide training and human resources development, and to assist airlines to achieve savings in their training budgets.

In the fourth quarter of 2009, the regional training center expanded its activities to include specialized courses in aviation and training programs to enhance the skills of human resources in the Arab region. This expansion resulted in the graduation of over 20,000 trainees. To meet the increased training needs of AACO Member Airlines, a new branch of the training center was opened in Cairo.

Annual General Meeting (AGM)
AACO AGM is the highest authority in AACO and comprises the CEOs of the Member Arab Airlines. The AGM gathers once a year to set the strategies and roadmap of AACO. The Annual General Assembly of AACO brings together the CEOs of member airlines in addition to a good deal of aviation stake-holders and industry partners, as well as international and local press.

Forums
AACO Forums aim at providing platforms for communication and networking between members, partner airlines, regulators, associations and suppliers in the aviation industry. In addition, those forums are always followed by closed meetings for member airlines only, where airlines discuss the outcome of the event and direct AACO to work on issues of common interest in relevant domains.

Publications
The NASHRA – Industry's Pulse & Arab Aviation – is AACO's official monthly bulletin that is distributed electronically in the English language. For a more interactive experience to the readers, The Nashra was re-designed in 2013 and became available also in digital format (E-Magazine) on mobiles, tablets, and PCs. The Nashra is a monthly recap of aviation in the Arab world on a regional and International level.
AACO Annual Report includes a review of the work conducted by AACO projects’ steering boards, work groups and task forces, in addition to the latest industry updates in the Arab world region and worldwide.
AATS – Arab Air Transport Statistics: This annual bulletin highlights the major operational developments related to the Arab airlines and airports as well as a synopsis on the world air transport developments at large, in addition to statistical information about general trends of the economy with emphasis on the air transport and tourism sectors in the Arab world. The bulletin includes brief information about each AACO member and partner airline.
3D Insight “AACO Quarterly Bulletin” is an electronic statistical and analytical bulletin in English.
Regulatory Update is a monthly electronic bulletin that covers all updates on aviation regulatory affairs in the Arab region and the world for the previous month.
Regional Training Center catalogue is a detailed description of the yearly training courses.

References

 
Arab League
Airline trade associations
Aviation in the Middle East
Organisations based in Beirut
1965 establishments in Lebanon